Jackpocket, Inc. is an American technology company headquartered in New York City. It produces an app for ordering lottery tickets in 14 U.S. states and the District of Columbia.

History 
Jackpocket was founded in 2013 by Peter Sullivan to create an app for ordering lottery tickets.

The company operates as a lottery courier service. It is the first registered lottery courier service in New York and New Jersey, the two U.S. states which have passed regulations for the operation of digital lottery courier services.

In December 2022, Jackpocket signed a sponsorship deal with  ice hockey team the Dallas Stars.

Series funding 
In October 2021, NJ.com reported that a New Jersey Lottery player had won a $9.4 million jackpot on a ticket ordered via the Jackpocket app.

In November 2021, the company raised a $120 million Series D round led by venture capital firm Left Lane Capital which included participation from Mark Cuban. To date, Jackpocket has raised $200 million and is valued at $620 million.

Casino license 
In 2022, Jackpocket received a casino license in New Jersey through a deal with Caesars Interactive Entertainment and will be launching iGaming products by 2023.

External links

References 

Companies based in New York City
Technology companies
Technology companies based in New York City
Lottery games in the United States